Oscar Davis was an American football guard for the Georgia Tech Yellow Jackets of the Georgia Institute of Technology. He was selected All-Southern and is a member of the Tech Athletics Hall of Fame and Tech All-Era Team (William Alexander Era). Davis was selected All-American in 1922 by Lawrence Perry and Billy Evans.

References

American football guards
All-American college football players
All-Southern college football players
Georgia Tech Yellow Jackets football players